Crimson is the fifth full-length studio album by Swedish death metal band Edge of Sanity, which is their first concept album and was released in 1996 by Black Mark Production. It features a single 40-minute track, telling a story in the distant future, when human civilization is about to end.

The album, which features Opeth frontman Mikael Åkerfeldt, received substantial critical acclaim, and is considered by most fans to be Edge of Sanity's finest achievement. A sequel, Crimson II, was released in 2003 and picks up directly where the first album left off. Both albums were remixed and slightly edited to fit together on one CD for release on the 2006 compilation When All Is Said; these new mixes/edits were split into sections and released digitally to online retailers and streaming services.

While the album was originally pressed on vinyl upon release in 1996, it was later reissued with Crimson II as a double vinyl in 2003. This version splits the song in half, the parts running 18:38 and 21:04 respectively.

Narrative
The album's single song tells the story of a world where humans no longer can bear children. Into this time of despair a child is born to the King and Queen of the barren Earth. The Queen dies during childbirth, and the King is left to rule the Earth and raise his daughter on his own. The people think the child is a sign that God will give them back the ability to reproduce, but as the child grows into a teenager humanity remains infertile. In time, the King dies and men fight over his throne.

The new King crushes rebellions against his illegitimate rule and is generally hated by the populace. Eventually the Child is persuaded to lead a coup. As she is left alone to plan, the forces of evil beckon to her. She accepts an unholy Master and gains strong magical powers. She slays the false King easily and begins ruling Earth. The people watch her obsessively, because it was thought that by restoring the rightful ruler they might be returned the gift of breeding.  But the new Queen misleads the people and slays the elders who the humans had preserved for their wisdom. Word of this gets out and a group of rebels gathers to stop her. They find a way to neutralize her power (by blinding her) and then place her in the same preservative tank of "crimson fluid" that the elders were kept in.

Track listing

Original edition

Japanese edition

Digital edition
The digital release of the album uses the When All is Said remix/edit and splits it differently, causing some movement times to shift out of alignment. Most of the tracks also fade in and out at the beginning/end.

Credits
Edge of Sanity
 Dan Swanö − lead vocals, acoustic guitar, rhythm guitar (center channel), harmony guitar, keyboards
 Andreas Axelsson − rhythm guitar (right channel)
 Sami Nerberg − rhythm guitar (left channel)
 Anders Lindberg − bass guitar
 Benny Larsson − drums, percussion

Additional musicians
 Anders Måreby − cello
 Mikael Åkerfeldt − additional vocals, lead guitar

Production
 Lyrics written by Axelsson/Swanö January 1996
 Recorded and mixed in Unisound by Dan Swanö and ProMix 1 December 1995 to January 1996
 Mastered and digitally edited by Peter in de Betou & Dan Swanö in Cutting Room, Stockholm January 1996
 Cover artwork by Duncan C. Storr
 Cover concept by Dan Swanö
 Design and Layout by Maren Lotz
 Executive Producer: Börje Forsberg
 Promotion: Björn Schrenk

References

External links
 Crimson lyrics

1996 albums
Concept albums
Edge of Sanity albums
Albums produced by Dan Swanö